Kemal Rüzgar (born 20 June 1995) is a footballer who plays as a forward for Şanlıurfaspor. Born in Germany, he represented Turkey at under-18 international level.

International career
Kemal Rüzgar is a youth international for Turkey at the U18 level.

References

External links
 
 

1995 births
German people of Turkish descent
People from Dillenburg
Sportspeople from Giessen (region)
Footballers from Hesse
Living people
German footballers
Turkish footballers
Turkey youth international footballers
Association football forwards
Fortuna Düsseldorf II players
Fortuna Düsseldorf players
VfL Osnabrück players
FC Viktoria Köln players
Altınordu F.K. players
Çaykur Rizespor footballers
Manisa FK footballers
Boluspor footballers
Şanlıurfaspor footballers
Regionalliga players
2. Bundesliga players
Oberliga (football) players
3. Liga players
TFF First League players
Süper Lig players
TFF Second League players